Terhune may refer to:

People
Albert Payson Terhune (1872–1942), American author
Christine Terhune Herrick (1859–1944), American author
Edward Payson Terhune (1830–1907), American author
Evelyn Terhune, (1932–1981), American Olympic fencer
Mary Virginia Terhune (1830–1922), American author
Max Terhune (1891–1973), American film actor
Warren Terhune (1869–1920), 13th Governor of American Samoa

Places
Terhune, Indiana, a small town in the United States
Terhune Orchards, a winery in New Jersey, United States
Terhune Run, a tributary of Lawrence Brook, New Jersey